Netherton and Orrell is a Metropolitan Borough of Sefton ward in the Bootle Parliamentary constituency that covers the southern part of the locality of Netherton, and all of the area of Orrell. The population of this ward taken at the 2011 census was 12,653.

Councillors

Election results

Elections of the 2010s

References

Wards of the Metropolitan Borough of Sefton